Arthrobacter cupressi is a Gram-positive and non-motile bacterium species from the genus Arthrobacter which has been isolated from rhizosphere soil from the tree Cupressus sempervirens in Mianyang in Sichuan province, China.

References

External links
Type strain of Arthrobacter cupressi at BacDive -  the Bacterial Diversity Metadatabase

Bacteria described in 2012
Micrococcaceae